The Park Lane Tower is a mixed-use 37-floor tower in the Business Bay district of Dubai, United Arab Emirates. Construction of the Park Lane Tower began in 2007 and was completed in 2016. The tower contains both commercial space and a hotel, beginning on the 19th floor.

Hotel 
The Hotel has 200 rooms, two pools, restaurants and separate spas for men and women.

See also 
 List of buildings in Dubai
 List of tallest buildings in Dubai

References

External links
Emporis

Skyscraper hotels in Dubai
Skyscraper office buildings in Dubai